Mayfly was an American Christian metal band from Dayton, Ohio, formed in 2011. They have released one extended play, Vereor Deus, Non Dogma, in 2014, with Voluminous Records. On March 14, 2017, the band announced that had disbanded.

Background
Mayfly is a Christian metal band from Dayton, Ohio, forming in 2012. Their members are vocalist and bassist, Tony Ford, vocalists and guitarists, Jared Lacey and Jeff Book, and drummer, Adam Thompson. The bands past members were Clifford Deweese from July 2012 until October 2012, Joel Holycross from March 2012 until October 2015, and Joliffe Huber from March 2015 until July 2015.

Music history
The band formed in 2012, with their first single, "Eternal Respiration", that was released in October 2012. Their first extended play, Vereor Deus, Non Dogma, Latin for "'Fear God, Not Dogma,'" was released on February 11, 2014, with Voluminous Records.

Members
Current members
 Tony Ford – vocals, bass
 Jared Lacey – vocals, guitar
 Jeff Book – vocals, guitar
 Adam Thompson – drums
Former members
 Clifford Deweese (July 2012-October 2012)
 Joel Holycross (March 2012-October 2015)
 Joliffe Huber (March 2015-July 2015)

Discography
EPs
 Vereor Deus, Non Dogma (February 11, 2014, Voluminous Records)

References

External links

2012 establishments in Ohio
American Christian metal musical groups
American nu metal musical groups
American progressive metal musical groups
Christian rock groups from Ohio
Musical groups established in 2012
Musical groups from Dayton, Ohio